Ernest Henry Dodd (21 March 1880 – 11 September 1918) was a New Zealand rugby union player. A hooker, Dodd represented  at a provincial level in 45 matches between 1901 and 1905, and appearing in the first ever Ranfurly Shield challenge in 1904. He made three appearances for the New Zealand national side: two games in 1901; and the test match against the touring Australian team at Tahuna Park, Dunedin, in 1905.

Dodd enlisted for service with the New Zealand Expeditionary Force in February 1917, and rose to the rank of lance sergeant in the New Zealand Rifle Brigade. He was killed in action in France on 9 September 1918, and was buried at the Metz-en-Couture Communal Cemetery British Extension.

References

1880 births
1918 deaths
Rugby union players from Dunedin
People educated at Wellington College (New Zealand)
New Zealand rugby union players
New Zealand international rugby union players
Wellington rugby union players
Rugby union hookers
New Zealand military personnel killed in World War I
New Zealand Military Forces personnel of World War I
New Zealand Army soldiers